Isaiah Punivai (born 1 December 2000, in New Zealand) is a New Zealand rugby union player who plays for  in the Mitre 10 Cup, and for the  in Super Rugby. His preferred playing position is centre, wing or fullback. After moving from Lower Hutt to Christchurch, Punivai attended Medbury School and Christ's College in Christchurch, until he was bought by Saint Kentigern College's 1st XV in Auckland for his last year of schooling. He signed for the Canterbury squad in 2020, and was named in the Crusaders squad for the 2021 season the same year.

Reference list

External links
itsrugby.co.uk profile
Ultimate Rugby profile

2000 births
New Zealand rugby union players
Living people
Rugby union centres
Rugby union wings
Rugby union fullbacks
Canterbury rugby union players
Crusaders (rugby union) players
Rugby union players from Lower Hutt
Tokyo Sungoliath players